The term box model may refer to:

Box modeling, in computer graphics
Climate box models, in climatology
Gravity current box models, in fluid mechanics
CSS box model in web development

See also
Internet Explorer box model bug, in the implementation of the CSS box model